Fay School is an independent, coeducational day and boarding school, located on a  campus some  from Boston in Southborough, Massachusetts. Fay opened its Primary School (pre-K to grade two) in 2010 and moved its 6th grade into the Lower School program (now 3rd to 6th) in the 2012–13 school year.

History 
Fay school was founded in 1866 by sisters Eliza Burnett Fay and Harriet Burnett in a former parsonage of the Unitarian church, across from St. Mark's School, where traditionally Fay students attended secondary school. The first year, the school had five day students and two boarders. At Eliza Fay's death in September 1896, her son, Waldo B. Fay, became headmaster. Under him, the school sizably grew, adding a new dormitory, school room, and library. He was succeeded by Edward W. Fay, Waldo B. Fay's son in 1918. In 1922, the school was officially incorporated, and the ownership of the school was transferred from the Fay family to the newly formed board of trustees.

Harrison L. Reinke became the first headmaster not in the Fay family since its foundation in 1942. He was succeeded by A. Brooks Harlow Jr., in 1969. The school became fully coeducational in 1977, having implemented a pilot program for girls in 1972. Girls had previously attended the school as day students through the late 19th century. Stephen V.A. Samborski became the sixth headmaster in 1988, who was followed by Stephen C. White in 1990. The Root Academic Center, the main academic building of the campus, was constructed in 2001. In 2008, Robert J. Gustavson Jr. became the eighth and current headmaster. In 2010, the primary school was opened.

Campus facilities 
The school is situated on a 30-acre main campus, with a nearby 36-acre athletic campus. There are ten fields, eight tennis courts, four basketball courts, two pools, and outdoor high and low ropes courses, along with two fitness centers and an indoor rock climbing wall. Its two libraries combined contain over 18,000 volumes. There are six dormitories, where students from 7th to 9th grade may live.

Notable alumni

Doug Brown (1979), NHL right winger, 1986–2001
Stephen Chao (1970), entrepreneur and media executive, former president of Fox Television, 1992; former president of USA Network, 1998–2001
Victor Chapman (1903), first American pilot killed in World War I
Eric Chou (2010), Mandopop singer songwriter
Michael D. Coe (1941), Yale professor, archeologist, Mesoamerican scholar
Robert Daniel (1949), United States representative from Virginia, 1973–1983
Tarah Donoghue Breed (1997), deputy press secretary to First Lady Laura Bush
Hamilton Fish III (1900), member of U.S. House of Representatives
Peter Fonda (1954), actor
George Foreman III (1998), boxer and entrepreneur
Glen Foster (1944), Olympic medalist, sailing, 1972 Summer Olympics
Topher Grace (1994), actor
C. Boyden Gray (1956), White House counsel, 1989–1993, United States ambassador to the European Union, 2006–2008
Prince Hashim Al Hussein (1996), prince of Jordan
Princess Iman bint Hussein (1998), princess of Jordan
Heyward Isham (1940), United States ambassador to Haiti, 1974–1977
James Simon Kunen (1962), journalist, lawyer, writer, author of The Strawberry Statement
Bruce Lawrence (1955), religious scholar, Duke University
 David McKean (1972), 22nd United States ambassador to Luxembourg 
Nicholas Negroponte (1958), founder and chairman emeritus of MIT's Media Lab; founder, One Laptop per Child
Robert E. Sherwood (1909), four-time Pulitzer Prize-winning playwright
James Jeremiah Wadsworth (1918), United States ambassador to the United Nations, 1960–1961
Damian Woetzel (1981), principal dancer at New York City Ballet, 1989–2008; seventh president of the Juilliard School
Rudi Ying (2014), Chinese professional ice hockey player currently with HC Kunlun Red Star of the Kontinental Hockey League (KHL). Representing China in the 2022 Winter Olympics.
Efrem Zimbalist Jr. (1931), Golden Globe-winning actor

References

Further reading
 Steward, Scott C. The Fay School: A History, 1866–1986. Southborough, MA: The Trustees of Fay School, 1988.

External links

Fay School
Junior Boarding School Association
Boarding School Review entry

Private elementary schools in Massachusetts
Private middle schools in Massachusetts
Educational institutions established in 1866
Schools in Worcester County, Massachusetts
Southborough, Massachusetts
1866 establishments in Massachusetts